Happy Go Lucky  is a 1943 American comedy film directed by Curtis Bernhardt and written by Walter DeLeon, Melvin Frank, John Jacoby and Norman Panama. The film stars Mary Martin, Dick Powell, Betty Hutton, Eddie Bracken, Rudy Vallée, Mabel Paige and Eric Blore. The film was released on January 4, 1943, by Paramount Pictures.  It might be best remembered now for Betty Hutton's energetic performance of the song "Murder, He Says," written by Frank Loesser and Jimmy McHugh.

Plot

Seeking a rich husband, nightclub cigarette girl Marjory Stuart sets sail on a luxury liner, posing as a wealthy heiress. A passenger, Pete Hamilton, spots her as a phony after discovering her valuable bracelet is actually made of paste.

While his pal Wally Case deals with an irate Bubbles Hennessy, a singer who is suing him for breach of promise, Pete befriends Marjory and volunteers to help her find a suitable guy. He singles out Alfred Monroe, who is not very exciting but definitely well-off. Marjory goes to work on Alfred, but nothing she tries, from flattery to alcohol, makes him fall for her.

A voodoo priestess gives Wally a love potion. Skeptical at first, he and Pete try it on Alfred and it works. Alfred is now madly in love with Marjory and she accepts his proposal, causing Pete to feel a pang of jealousy. Before she can leave, Marjory's true identity's become known and the hotel demands that she pay her bill. Pete and Wally scheme to steal Bubbles's expensive brooch and raffle it off.

Bubbles uses the potion on Wally and gets him to the altar. Marjory, meanwhile, sails off for New York with her new beau, Alfred, who generously offers $2,000 to Pete for introducing him to his bride-to-be. A despondent Pete later is delighted to find Marjory waiting for him by herself, love potion in hand.

Cast
Mary Martin as Marjory Stuart
Dick Powell as Pete Hamilton
Betty Hutton as Bubbles Hennessy
Eddie Bracken as Wally Case
Rudy Vallée as Alfred Monroe
Mabel Paige as Mrs. Smith
Eric Blore as Betsman
Clem Bevans as Mr. Smith
Rita Christiani as Rita Christiani
Sir Lancelot as Calypso Singer

References

External links 
 

1943 films
1940s English-language films
American comedy films
1943 comedy films
Paramount Pictures films
Films directed by Curtis Bernhardt
1940s American films